Lobodontidius congoanus is a species of beetle in the family Carabidae, the only species in the genus Lobodontidius.

References

Lebiinae